Luis René López (born 27 February 1978) is a Venezuelan judoka. He competed in the men's middleweight event at the 2000 Summer Olympics.

References

1978 births
Living people
Venezuelan male judoka
Olympic judoka of Venezuela
Judoka at the 2000 Summer Olympics
Place of birth missing (living people)